In human anatomy, the left gastric artery arises from the celiac artery and runs along the superior portion of the lesser curvature of the stomach before anastomosing with the right gastric artery (which runs right to left). It also issues esophageal branches that supply lower esophagus and ascend through the esophageal hiatus to form anastomoses with the esophageal branches of thoracic part of aorta.

Clinical significance
In terms of disease, the left gastric artery may be involved in peptic ulcer disease: if an ulcer erodes through the stomach mucosa into a branch of the artery, this can cause massive blood loss into the stomach, which may result in such symptoms as hematemesis or melaena.

Additional images

References

External links
  - "Stomach, Spleen and Liver: The Right and Left Gastric Artery"
 
 
 Branching at uhrad.com

Arteries of the abdomen
Stomach